Alexander Simpson may refer to:

 Alexander Simpson (politician) (1872–1953), American journalist, attorney and politician
 Alexander Lockhart Simpson (1785–1861), Scottish minister
 Alexander Russell Simpson (1835–1916), Scottish physician
 Alex Simpson (1924–2008), Scottish footballer